Russia competed at the 2014 Summer Youth Olympics, in Nanjing, China from 16 August to 28 August 2014.

Medalists
Medals awarded to participants of mixed-NOC teams are represented in italics. These medals are not counted towards the individual NOC medal tally.

|width="30%" align=left valign=top|

Competitors

Athletics

Russia used 9 of their 18 quotas based on its performance at the European Olympic Youth Trials.

Boys
Track and Road Events

Field Events

Girls
Track and Road Events

Field Events

Basketball

Russia qualified a boys' team from their performance at the 2013 U18 3x3 World Championships.

Skills Competition

Boys' tournament

Roster
 Kirill Gornaev
 Vladimir Ivanov
 Vladislav Staratelev
 Alexey Zherdev

Group Stage

Knockout stage

Beach volleyball

Russia qualified a boys' and girls' team from their performance at the 2014 CEV Youth Continental Cup Final.

Boxing

Russia qualified three boxers based on its performance at the 2014 AIBA Youth World Championships

Boys

Canoeing

Russia qualified two boats based on its performance at the 2013 World Junior Canoe Sprint and Slalom Championships.

Boys

Girls

Fencing

Russia qualified four athletes based on its performance at the 2014 FIE Cadet World Championships.

Boys

Girls

Mixed team

Gymnastics

Artistic gymnastics

Russia qualified one athlete based on its performance at the 2014 European MAG Championships and another athlete based on its performance at the 2014 European WAG Championships.

Boys

Girls

Rhythmic gymnastics

Russia qualified one individual and one team based on its performance at the 2014 Rhythmic Gymnastics Grand Prix in Moscow.

Individual

Group

Trampoline

Russia qualified two athletes based on its performance at the 2014 European Trampoline Championships.

Handball

Russia qualified a girls' team based on its performance at the 2013 European Women's Youth Handball Championship

Girls' tournament

Roster

 Daria Belikova
 Marianna Egorova
 Yaroslava Frolova
 Yulia Golikova
 Julia Komarova
 Kristina Likhach
 Elizaveta Malashenko
 Yulia Markova
 Anastasia Riabtceva
 Anastasia Starshova
 Anastasia Suslova
 Anastasia Titovskaya
 Valentina Vernigorova
 Liudmila Vydrina

Group stage

Semifinal

Final

Judo

Russia qualified two athletes based on its performance at the 2013 Cadet World Judo Championships.

Individual

Team

Modern pentathlon

Russia qualified two athletes based on its performance at the European YOG Qualifiers.

Sailing

Russia qualified one boat based on its performance at the 2013 Techno 293 World Championships. Later Russia qualified one more boat based on its performance at the Techno 293 European Continental Qualifiers.

Shooting

Russia qualified two shooters based on its performance at the 2014 European Shooting Championships.

Individual

Team

Swimming

Russia qualified eight swimmers.

Boys

Girls

Mixed

Taekwondo

Russia qualified three athletes based on its performance at the Taekwondo Qualification Tournament.

Boys

Girls

Tennis

Russia qualified four athletes based on the 9 June 2014 ITF World Junior Rankings.

Singles

Doubles

Triathlon

Russia qualified two athletes based on its performance at the 2014 European Youth Olympic Games Qualifier.

Individual

Relay

Weightlifting

Russia qualified 2 quotas in the boys' events and 2 quotas in the girls' events based on the team ranking after the 2013 Weightlifting Youth World Championships.

Boys

Girls

Wrestling

Russia qualified five athletes based on its performance at the 2014 European Cadet Championships.

Boys

Girls

References

2014 in Russian sport
Nations at the 2014 Summer Youth Olympics
Russia at the Youth Olympics